Exeristes is a genus of ichneumon wasps in the family Ichneumonidae. There are about nine described species in Exeristes.

Species
These nine species belong to the genus Exeristes:
 Exeristes arundinis (Kriechbaumer, 1887) c g
 Exeristes comstockii (Cresson, 1880) c g b
 Exeristes denticulator Aubert, 1983 c g
 Exeristes kamrupa (Gupta & Tikar, 1976) c g
 Exeristes longiseta (Ratzeburg, 1844) c g
 Exeristes montanus Constantineanu & Pisica, 1970 c g
 Exeristes roborator (Fabricius, 1793) c g
 Exeristes ruficollis (Gravenhorst, 1829) c
 Exeristes shanxiensis Wang, 2000 c g
Data sources: i = ITIS, c = Catalogue of Life, g = GBIF, b = Bugguide.net

References

Further reading

External links

 

Pimplinae